Noble families of Don Cossacks in alphabetical order includes the old original Cossack noble families from Free Don, families which titles were granted by the Tsars of Moskovia and Russian Imperators after including of the territories of Free Don in to Russian Imperium. Most of the origin Don Cossacks families were a landowners that provoked Russian peasants to escape to Don and work on their lands, like General Atamans of the Efremov family. Free territories of Don Cossacks known from the beginning of 14th century until the end of the 16th century when Moscow gained control of them.

See also
 List of Russian commanders in the Patriotic War of 1812
 Military Gallery of the Winter Palace
 Russian nobility
 Don Cossacks

References

External links
 Shumkov, A.A., Ryklis, I.G. List of noble families of the Don Cossacks in alphabetical order. VIRD Publ House, Sankt-Peterburg. 2000, 
 Some of portraits in the Military Gallery of the Winter Palace are of Don Cassacks Generals by George Dawe

Don Cossacks noble families
History of the Don Cossacks
Doncossacks